Buchenbach is a municipality in the south west of the Black Forest in Germany.

Buchenbach or Büchenbach may also refer to:
Büchenbach, a municipality in the district of Roth, in Bavaria, Germany
Büchenbach (Pegnitz), a district of Pegnitz, in Upper Franconia, Bavaria, Germany
Büchenbach (Erlangen), a district of Erlangen, in Middle Franconian, Bavaria, Germany
Buchenbach (Lauter), a river in Baden-Württemberg, Germany, tributary of the Lauter
Buchenbach (Murr), a river in Baden-Württemberg, Germany, tributary of the Murr